Jermaine Gumbs (born 5 May 1986) is a footballer who plays as a striker. Born in England, he represented Anguilla at international level.

Career
Born in Slough, Gumbs played for Beaconsfield SYCOB, Slough Town, Windsor & Eton, Binfield, Hillingdon Borough, Uxbridge, Marlow, Windsor, Burnham, Amersham Town, Harefield United and AFC Hayes.

He made two international appearances for Anguilla in 2008, both of which came in FIFA World Cup qualifying matches.

Personal life
He is the cousin of fellow player Romell Gumbs.

References

1986 births
Living people
Anguillan footballers
Anguilla international footballers
English footballers
English people of Anguillan descent
Beaconsfield Town F.C. players
Slough Town F.C. players
Windsor & Eton F.C. players
Burnham F.C. players
Binfield F.C. players
Hillingdon Borough F.C. players
Uxbridge F.C. players
Marlow F.C. players
Windsor F.C. players
Amersham Town F.C. players
Harefield United F.C. players
A.F.C. Hayes players
Association football forwards
Southern Football League players
Sportspeople from Slough
Footballers from Berkshire